Pianism is a jazz album by Michel Petrucciani.

The album was recorded at RCA Studio "C", and was produced by Mike Berniker, engineer Mike Moran. The Blue Note catalogue number is CDP 7 46295 2.

This was Petrucciani's first album recorded under contract for Blue Note, the previous recordings having originally been released by Concord and others (though some were subsequently reissued by Blue Note).

Personnel
Michel Petrucciani - Piano
Palle Danielsson - Bass
Eliot Zigmund - Drums

Track listing
 "The Prayer" (Michel Petrucciani) – 11:05
 "Our Tune" (Michel Petrucciani)– 6:51
 "Face's Face" (Michel Petrucciani) – 4:37 
 "Night And Day" (Cole Porter) – 9:20
 "Here's That Rainy Day" (Van Heusen / Burke) - 9:51
 "Regina" (Michel Petrucciani) - 9:20

References 

1986 albums
Michel Petrucciani albums
Blue Note Records albums